Moran of the Mounted is a 1926 American silent western film directed by Harry Joe Brown and starring Reed Howes, Sheldon Lewis and Virginia Warwick. A northern, it was distributed by the independent Rayart Pictures, the forerunner of Monogram Pictures.

Synopsis
Moran, a Mountie, is accused of killing the father of the woman he loves. He is given one week to track down the real culprit.

Cast
 Reed Howes as Moran
 Sheldon Lewis as 	Lamont
 J.P. McGowan as 	Sgt. Churchill
 Bruce Gordon as Carlson
 Virginia Warwick as 	Fleurette
 Billy Franey as 	'Mooch' Mullens
 Harry Semels as 	Dubuc
 Chief Yowlachie as 	Biting Wolf

References

Bibliography
 Connelly, Robert B. The Silents: Silent Feature Films, 1910-36, Volume 40, Issue 2. December Press, 1998.

External links
 

1920s American films
1926 films
1926 Western (genre) films
1920s English-language films
American silent feature films
Silent American Western (genre) films
American black-and-white films
Films directed by Harry Joe Brown
Rayart Pictures films